Vysoká is a mountain in the Zlín Region and Moravian-Silesian Region of the Czech Republic.

References

Mountains and hills of the Czech Republic
Mountains of the Western Carpathians